Lax-Kwʼalaams, previously called Port Simpson until 1986, is an Indigenous village community in British Columbia, Canada, not far from the city of Prince Rupert.  It is located on Port Simpson Indian Reserve No. 1, which is shared with other residential communities of the Tsimshian Nation. The Nine Allied Tribes are: Gilutsʼaaw, Ginadoiks, Ginaxangiik, Gispaxloʼots, Gitando, Gitlaan, Gitsʼiis, Gitwilgyoots, and Gitzaxłaał.

History 
Lax-Kwʼalaams derives from Laxłguʼalaams, also formerly spelled Lach Goo Alams, which means "place of the wild roses,"  It is an ancient camping spot of the Gispaxloʼots tribe. In 1834 the Hudson's Bay Company (HBC) set up a trading post there called Fort Simpson, then Port Simpson.  The facility was named after Capt. Aemilius Simpson, superintendent of the HBC's Marine Department, who in 1830 had established the first, short-lived, Fort Simpson, on the nearby Nass River with Peter Skene Ogden. The HBC set up Fort Simpson in order to undermine American dominance of the Maritime Fur Trade along the Pacific Coast. The first HBC factor at the new Fort Simpson was Dr. John Frederick Kennedy. He married the daughter of chief Ligeex of the Gispaxloʼots, as part of the diplomacy which established the fort on Gispaxloʼots territory. Kennedy served at Fort Simpson until 1856.

In 1857 an Anglican lay missionary named William Duncan brought Christianity to Lax Kwʼalaams. But, feeling that the dissipated fort atmosphere was bad for the souls of his Tsimshian followers, he relocated with more than 800 of his flock to Metlakatla, at Metlakatla Pass just to the south. They later moved to Annette Island, Alaska, where he gained authority from the US Congress for an Indian reservation.

Lax Kwʼalaams was without missionaries until 1874, when Rev. Thomas Crosby of the Methodist church arrived.  The community is still predominantly Methodist (i.e. United Church of Canada).  Crosby's wife, Emma Crosby, founded the Methodist-affiliated Crosby Girls' Home in the community in the 1880s. It became part of B.C.'s Indian residential school system in 1893 and operated until 1948.

In 1931 the Native Brotherhood of British Columbia was founded in Port Simpson as the province's first Native-run rights organization.  Its four founders included the Tsimshian ethnologist William Beynon and hereditary Chief William Jeffrey.

Duncan estimated the population of Lax Kwʼalaams in 1857 as 2,300, living in 140 houses.  Approximately 500 died shortly after Duncan's departure during the 1862 Pacific Northwest smallpox epidemic.  Today Lax Kwʼalaams is the largest of the seven Tsimshian village communities in Canada.  Its population in 1983 was 882.  As of 2009 the Lax-kwʼalaams First Nation has 3,219 members. In 2011, there were 678 individuals living on the reserve. There are about 10,000 Tsimshian in British Columbia; they are the most numerous indigenous people in the province.

The legal and political interests of the people of Lax Kwʼalaams vis à vis the provincial and federal governments are represented by the Allied Tsimshian Tribes Association, which represents the hereditary chiefs of the Nine Tribes. The Tsimshian have a matrilineal kinship system, with property and descent passed through the maternal lines. Hereditary chiefs come from the maternal lines.

In November 2016, a study published in Nature Communications linked the genome of 25 Indigenous people who inhabited modern-day Prince Rupert, British Columbia 1000 to 6000 years ago with their descendants in the Lax-Kwʼalaams community.

Until it was renamed, Port Simpson was named for Captain Aemilius Simpson a distant relative of Sir George Simpson.

Notable residents
Frederick Alexcee, artist
William Beynon, hereditary chief and ethnologist
Alfred Dudoward, hereditary chief
Bill Helin, artist
Chief William Jeffrey, hereditary chief, carver and activist
Odille Morison, linguist and artifact collector
Rev. William Henry Pierce, missionary and memoirist
Terry Starr, artist
Henry W. Tate, oral historian
Arthur Wellington Clah, hereditary chief and diarist

Bibliography
 Bolt, Clarence (1992) Thomas Crosby and the Tsimshian: Small Shoes for Feet Too Large.  Vancouver: UBC Press.
 Garfield, Viola (1939) "Tsimshian Clan and Society,"  University of Washington Publications in Anthropology, vol. 7, no. 3, pp. 167–340.
 Hare, Jan, and Jean Barman (2006) Good Intentions Gone Awry: Emma Crosby and the Methodist Mission on the Northwest Coast.  Afterword by Caroline Dudoward.  Vancouver: UBC Press.
 Inglis, Gordon B., et al. (1990) "Tsimshians of British Columbia since 1900."  In Handbook of North American Indians, Volume 7: Northwest Coast, pp. 285–293.  Washington: Smithsonian Institution.
 Large, R. Geddes (1957; reprinted, 1981) The Skeena: River of Destiny.  Sidney, B.C.: Gray's Publishing.
 Meilleur, Helen (2001) A Pour of Rain: Stories from a West Coast Fort.  Vancouver: Raincoast Books.
 Neylan, Susan (2001) The Heavens Are Changing: Nineteenth-Century Protestant Missions and Tsimshian Christianity.  Montreal: McGill-Queen's University Press.
Calvin Helin - Tsimshian Lax Kw'alaams (2008) "Dancing with dependency," (2010) "Out of poverty through self-reliance"

References

External links

 Photos
 

Tsimshian
North Coast of British Columbia
Hudson's Bay Company trading posts